Angaco is a department of the province of San Juan
(Argentina). It is located in the center east of the province, especially in a desert landscape with mountains. Characterized by their remarkable wine production

Toponymy 
Angaco home means Araucanian water or streams that are at the foot of a hill.

References

Departments of San Juan Province, Argentina